The 2006–07 Philadelphia 76ers season was the 68th season of the franchise, 58th in the National Basketball Association (NBA). The Sixers finished with a record of 35–47. The 2006–07 Sixers season also marked the end of Allen Iverson's tenure with the Sixers, after a blockbuster trade sent him to Denver in return for Andre Miller, Joe Smith, and two first round draft picks in the 2007 NBA draft. It was the Sixers’ first season since 1995-96 without Iverson on the roster. He would eventually return to the Sixers for the 2009-10 season. Despite the trade, and after having a record of 5–18 before the Iverson trade, the Sixers finished 30–29 for the remainder of the season.

Key dates
 June 28: The 2006 NBA draft took place in New York City.
 July 1: The free agency period started.
 October 10: The Sixers pre-season started with a game against the Phoenix Suns.
 November 1: The Sixers season started with a game against the Atlanta Hawks.
 December 19: All-Star guard Allen Iverson is traded to the Denver Nuggets, ending his 11-year tenure with the Sixers.
 January 11: The Sixers buy out Chris Webber's contract for $25 million.
 January 22: The Sixers defeated the Denver Nuggets 108–97, in what was Iverson's first game against his former team.
 February 28: With a win against the Suns, the Sixers ended the Phoenix Suns' bid to become the first team to go undefeated against all Eastern Conference opponents on the road.
 April 15: The Sixers were officially eliminated from playoff contention after losing to the Orlando Magic.

Draft picks
Philadelphia's selections from the 2006 NBA draft in New York City.

Roster
{| class="toccolours" style="font-size: 95%; |width:100%;"
|-
! colspan="2" style="background-color: black;  color: #D9AF62; text-align: center;" | Philadelphia 76ers roster
|- style="background-color: #D80303; color: white;   text-align: center;"
! Players !! Coaches
|-
| valign="top" |
{| class="sortable" style="background:white; margin:0px; width:100%;"
! Pos. !! # !! Nat. !! Name !! Ht. !! Wt. !! From

Regular season

Standings

Record vs. opponents

Schedule

Player statistics

Regular season

Transactions
The 76ers have been involved in the following transactions during the 2006–07 season.

Trades

References

See also
 2006–07 NBA season

Philadelphia 76ers seasons
Philadelphia
Philadelphia
Philadelphia